Team Tango is an American aircraft manufacturer based in Williston, Florida and owned by Revolution Aviation Inc. The company specializes in the design and manufacture of light aircraft in the form of kits for amateur construction.

Aircraft

References

External links

Aircraft manufacturers of the United States
Homebuilt aircraft
Williston, Florida
Companies based in Florida